Kaset Green Hawk is an aerial display team of the Bureau of Royal Rainmaking and Agricultural Aviation (KASET) of Thailand formed from rainmaking aircraft and crews.

References

Cessna
Aerobatic teams
Aviation in Thailand